Remire or Rémire may refer to:

 Remire-Montjoly, a commune of French Guiana
 Remire Island, one of the Amirante Islands in the Seychelles